Boyd Adams is a former NASCAR driver. He started his first and only Grand National Division - later known as the Winston Cup Series - race at the Nashville Speedway in Nashville, Tennessee, during the 1965 Nashville 400.

He started the race last in a '63 Ford, driving for Reid Shaw. In the 400-lap race, he completed only 15 laps, retiring due to a problem with the car's gas tank, and earned only $100. He finished 23rd of the 24 starters.

Motorsports career results

NASCAR 
(key) (Bold – Pole position awarded by qualifying time. Italics – Pole position earned by points standings or practice time. * – Most laps led.)

Grand National Series

References

External links

Living people
Sportspeople from Nashville, Tennessee
Racing drivers from Nashville, Tennessee
Racing drivers from Tennessee
NASCAR drivers
1934 births